BBC Scotland (also referred to as the BBC Scotland channel) is a British English language free-to-air public broadcast television channel that is under the BBC Scotland division of the BBC. It airs a nightly lineup of entirely Scottish programming. The channel launched 24 February 2019, replacing the BBC Two Scotland opt-out of BBC Two, but operating as an autonomous channel (displacing BBC Four on Freeview in Scotland).

History 
As of 2017, BBC Scotland had operated regional variations of BBC One and BBC Two for the Scottish region, as well as the Gaelic channel BBC Alba. On 22 February 2017, BBC director general Lord Hall announced that the corporation planned to replace BBC Two Scotland with a new, part-time BBC Scotland television channel, focused exclusively on Scottish programming. A feature of the channel would be an hour-long 9:00 p.m. weeknight newscast produced from Scotland, covering national and international headlines from a Scottish perspective. The proposed newscast was compared to the frequent proposals for a Scotland opt-out of the BBC News at Six. Hall also announced that the BBC would increase its overall spending on factual and drama productions in Scotland by £20 million annually.

Ofcom granted provisional approval to the new service in April 2018, but showed concerns for its proposal to only dedicate half of its lineup to new programmes (seeing it as removing potential opportunities for independent producers), and directed the BBC to ensure that the channel does not have an undue impact on competing news outlets (including newspapers and other broadcasters, with the former expressing concern that the BBC would poach employees from newspapers to build its expanded Scotland news operation). Ofcom granted final approval to the service in June 2018: the BBC subsequently announced a planned launch for February 2019. The channel will be allocated £32 million in annual funding.

In preparation for the launch of the new channel, BBC Two Scotland was discontinued and replaced by the networked version beginning 18 February. BBC Scotland launched 24 February at 7:00 p.m.; it signed on with an introductory video, featuring a performance of "Miracle" by the Scottish synthpop group Chvrches, accompanied by the BBC Scottish Symphony Orchestra. Its first programme was a variety special (A Night at the Theatre) hosted by comedian Iain Stirling. Opening night programming also included the broadcast television premiere of the documentary Nae Pasaran, the one-off Burnistoun special Burnistoun Tunes In, and the ninth and final series premiere of Still Game. Viewership peaked at 700,000.

Programming 
BBC Scotland's main broadcast hours are 7:00 p.m. to midnight. At least 95% of programming must be of Scottish origin, and the BBC stated that roughly half of its programming would be new.  Between noon and 7:00 p.m., the channel simulcasts the BBC Two schedule with BBC Scotland continuity, thereby accommodating the daytime sport and political programming opt-outs which had been displaced following the closure of BBC Two Scotland.

The channel airs a 9:00 p.m. newscast, The Nine, presented by Rebecca Curran and Martin Geissler, which features coverage of national and international headlines from a Scottish perspective.

On Saturday nights there is a 15-minute programme aired called The Edit which covers the week's entertainment news. It is presented by Amy Irons and David Farrell.

BBC Scotland has traditionally shown sport on Friday evenings with Scottish Championship and the early rounds of the Scottish Cup matches featuring on Sportscene presented by Leanne Crichton and Steven Thompson from 7.00pm. With football talk show A View From The Terrace, adapted from the cult Terrace Scottish Football Podcast aired later on Friday evenings. AVFTT is produced by Edinburgh-based Studio Something and is presented by Craig Telfer, with analysis from Shaughan McGuigan, and The Scotsman journalists Craig Fowler and Joel Sked.

On weekends, there is a 15-minute news programme called The Seven.

The first main programme to air on BBC Scotland was the 9th series premiere of Still Game on the channel's first day.

The channel’s first drama commission Guilt was a significant success, receiving a strong critical reception and winning a number of awards. Guilt has gone on to be broadcast around the world.

Continuity announcers 
There are three main continuity announcers on the BBC Scotland channel, who also double up as playout directors, overseeing transmission of the channel's programming and presentation.
  
 Dominic Main from Drongan was a student at the University of the West of Scotland and has studied broadcast production for many years.
 George Taylor from Glasgow worked in marketing for The Sunday Times and The Times Scotland.
 Jennie Cook from Kingussie is a former Capital Scotland breakfast presenter.
 Cameron McKenna from Glasgow (relief announcer) is a former STV continuity announcer and a former radio newsreader.

All continuity on the channel is performed live and broadcast from Pacific Quay.

Identification 
BBC Scotland's idents feature the channel's logo in the centre of the screen, usually accompanied with a background that fits the colour of the logo when it eventually is lit up. In the first set of idents, the BBC Scotland logo is featured among cobblestones on a rainy street, a bird which flies around the logo as well as a subway station (specifically Buchanan Street subway station in Glasgow).

See also 
BBC One Scotland

References

Notes

External links 

BBC television channels in the United Kingdom
English-language television stations in the United Kingdom
BBC Scotland
Television channels and stations established in 2019
2019 establishments in Scotland
Television channels in Scotland